This is a list of all penalty shoot-outs that have occurred in the final tournaments of the UEFA European Championship.

Complete list
 Key
  = scored penalty
  = missed penalty
  = scored penalty which ended the shoot-out
  = missed penalty which ended the shoot-out
  = first penalty in the shoot-out
 horizontal line within a list of takers = beginning of the sudden death stage

Notes

Statistics

Key
† = shoot-out in the final
Bold = winners that year

Shoot-out records
Most shoot-outs in a tournament
4 – 1996, 2020

Fewest shoot-outs in a tournament (since 1976)
0 – 1988

Most played shoot-out
2 –  vs  (2008, 2020),  vs  (2012, 2020†)

Most penalties taken in a shoot-out
18 –  vs  (1980),  vs  (2016)

Fewest penalties taken in a shoot-out
7 –  vs  (2008)

Most penalties scored in a shoot-out
17 –  vs  (1980)

Fewest penalties scored in a shoot-out
4 –  vs  (2000),  vs  (2008),  vs  (2020)

Most penalties missed in a shoot-out
7 –  vs  (2016)

Team records
Most shoot-outs played
7 –  (1980, 2000, 2008, 2012, 2016, 2020†x2)

Most shoot-outs played in a tournament
2 –  (1996),  (1996),  (2016),  (2020),  (2020),  (2020†)

Most shoot-out wins
4 –  (1984, 2008, 2012, 2020),  (2000, 2012, 2020†×2)

Most shoot-out wins in a tournament
2 –  (2020†)

Most shoot-out losses
4 –  (1996, 2004, 2012, 2020†)

Most consecutive shoot-out wins
3 –  (1976†1, 19801, 1996),   (2008, 2012, 2020)

Most consecutive shoot-out losses
4 –  (1996, 2004, 2012, 2020†)

Most shoot-out wins without losses
3 –  (1976†1, 19801, 1996)

Most shoot-out losses without wins
1 –  (2004),  (2008)

Most knockout matches played without shoot-outs (since 1976)
5 –  (1980, 2016×2, 2020×2)

Fewest penalties scored in a shoot-out
1 –  (2000),  (2008),  (2020)

Most penalties scored in a shoot-out
9 –  (19801)

Most penalties missed in a shoot-out
4 –  (2016)

Taker records
Most participations in shoot-outs
3 –  Fabian Schär (2016, 2020×2),  Leonardo Bonucci (2016, 2020†×2)

Most penalties scored in shoot-outs
2 – 26 players

Most deciding final penalties scored in shoot-outs
2 –  Cesc Fàbregas (2008, 2012)

Goalkeeper records
Most participations in shoot-outs
3 –  Edwin van der Sar (1996, 2000, 2004),  Gianluigi Buffon (2008, 2012, 2016),  Yann Sommer (2016, 2020×2)

Most penalties faced in shoot-outs
18 –  Gianluigi Buffon

Most penalties conceded in shoot-outs
12 –  Edwin van der Sar,  Gianluigi Buffon,  Yann Sommer

Most penalties missed against (saves and off-target shots) in shoot-outs
6 –  Gianluigi Buffon

By team

Championship year in bold

Notes
1 Participated as  
2 Participated as  
3 Participated as

By year

Penalty shoot-outs were introduced to the UEFA European Championship in 1976. 
Before 1976, there were 17 matches during the first four tournaments from 1960 to 1972: 16 scheduled matches ( four per tournament ) and 1 replay match. Only 2 of those matches were not decided within 120 minutes. The Euro 1968 semi-final between Italy and the Soviet Union was decided by coin toss. When the Euro 1968 final between Italy and Yugoslavia was level after 120 minutes, a replay was scheduled instead of a coin toss. Both the semi-final coin toss and the final replay were won by Italy, the hosts.
Since 2004, if only two teams finish the group stage with the same record (points as well as goals scored and conceded), and they drew against each other on the final matchday, a penalty shoot-out would be used to determine their final ranking. However, no such instance has yet occurred.

Highest and lowest numbers in bold

See also
List of Copa América penalty shoot-outs
List of FIFA World Cup penalty shoot-outs

References

External links
 

Penalty shoot-outs